A by-election for the United Kingdom House of Commons was held in the constituency of Vauxhall on 15 June 1989, following the resignation of sitting Member of Parliament (MP) Stuart Holland.

The winner, Kate Hoey, was Minister for Sport in Tony Blair's Labour government from 1999 to 2001 before returning to the backbenches.

The 1989 by-election was caused by Stuart Holland's resignation to take up an academic job in preference to remaining in the Labour Party. There was controversy surrounding the Labour candidate selection process. Martha Osamor had the most nominations, with Hoey only having one, but the National Executive Committee declined to shortlist Osamor and imposed a shortlist on the constituency party. When the local party refused to choose from the shortlist, Hoey was imposed by the NEC as the Labour candidate.

Candidates
The by-election was contested by 14 candidates: one of the longest lists of serious candidates at any by-election in the 1980s. Don Milligan stood as the candidate of the Revolutionary Communist Party and made the struggle for gay equality the centrepiece of his campaign. Rev Hewie Andrew stood as "The People's Candidate", out of protest at the Labour Party's selection process for their candidate.  There were two "Green" candidates: Henry Bewley (who represented the Green Party officially, and Dominic Allen (sponsored by a religious cult) who used the title "The Greens".  This was the first time the Green Party saved its deposit in a UK Parliamentary election. There were two National Front candidates, from their warring "Official" and "Flag" factions.

At close of nominations, there had been 15 contenders, with rival candidates for the 'Social & Liberal Democrats' and 'Continuing Social Democratic Party'. However, the SDP candidate, Tom Edwards, withdrew his candidature before the notice of poll.

Result

See also
Lists of United Kingdom by-elections

References

Vauxhall by-election
Vauxhall by-election
Vauxhall,1989
Vauxhall,1989
Vauxhall by-election